The 2017–18 Kansas Jayhawks women's basketball team represented the University of Kansas in the 2017–18 NCAA Division I women's basketball season. The Jayhawks were led by third year head coach Brandon Schneider. They played their home games at Allen Fieldhouse in Lawrence, Kansas as members of the Big 12 Conference. They finished the season 12–18, 3–15 in Big 12 play to finish in ninth place. They lost in the first round of the Big 12 Tournament to Kansas State.

Previous season
The Jayhawks finished the 2016–17 season 8–22, 2–16 in Big 12 play to finish in last place. They lost in the first round of the Big 12 Tournament to Oklahoma State.

Roster

Schedule and results 

|-
!colspan=12 style=""| Exhibition

|-
!colspan=12 style=""| Non-conference regular season

|-
!colspan=12 style=""| Big 12 regular season

|-
!colspan=12 style=""| Big 12 Tournament

x- All JTV games will air on Metro Sports, ESPN3 and local affiliates.

See also 
 2017–18 Kansas Jayhawks men's basketball team

References 

Kansas Jayhawks women's basketball seasons
Kansas
Kansas Jayhawks women's basketball
Kansas Jayhawks women's basketball